This article describes the squads for the 2000 African Women's Championship.

The age listed for each player is on 11 November 2000, the first day of the tournament. The numbers of caps and goals listed for each player do not include any matches played after the start of the tournament. The club listed is the club for which the player last played a competitive match prior to the tournament. A flag is included for coaches who are of a different nationality than their own national team.

Group A

Réunion
Head coach: Patrick Honorine

South Africa
Head coaches: Fran Hilton-Smith and Ephraim Mashaba

Uganda
Head coach: Sam Timbe

Zimbabwe
Head coach: Benedict Moyo

Group B

Cameroon
Head coach: Robert Atah

Ghana
Head coach: PSK Paha

Morocco
Head coach: Alaoui Slimani

Nigeria
Head coach: Ismaila Mabo

References

squads
Women's Africa Cup of Nation's squads